is a Shinto shrine in Okazaki, Aichi Prefecture, Japan. It enshrines the first Shōgun of the Tokugawa Shogunate, Tokugawa Ieyasu.

History
In 1644, Shōgun Tokugawa Iemitsu ordered the construction of a shrine to his deified grandfather, Tokugawa Ieyasu, near the location of his birthplace at Okazaki Castle. Sakai Tadakatsu and Matsudaira Masatsuna were assigned the task, which was completed on September 17, 1646. In 1917, it was merged with a nearby Hakusan and a Hiyoshi Jinja, and was renamed "Tokiwa Jinja" (常磐神社). It received the rank of a village shrine (村社) under the State Shinto system's Modern system of ranked Shinto shrines.

In 1953, the Honden, Heiden, Torii, Middle Gate  and Ablution font of the shrine were designed Important Cultural Properties. The shrine also possesses two tachi Japanese swords which are designated as Important Cultural Properties. One was a donation by Tokugawa Iemitsu and the other by Tokugawa Ietsuna.

In 1954, the shrine was renamed Takisan Tōshō-gū.

The shrine is approximately 15 minutes on foot from Higashi Okazaki Station.

See also 
Tōshō-gū
List of Tōshō-gū

References

External links

Official home page

1646 establishments in Japan
Shinto shrines in Aichi Prefecture
Tōshō-gū
Okazaki, Aichi
Religious buildings and structures completed in 1646